This is a list of diplomatic missions in Algeria. There are currently 92 embassies and a Delegation of the European Commission in Algiers, and many countries maintain consulates in other Algerian cities (not including honorary consulates).

Embassies in Algiers

Missions in Algiers 
  (Delegation)

Consulates

Consulate in Algiers

Consulates-General in Annaba

Consulates-General in Oran

Consulate-General in Sidi Bel Abbes

Consulate in Tamanrasset

Consulate in Tébessa

Non-resident embassies

Resident in Paris 

 
 
 
 
 
 
 
 
 
 
 
 
  
 
 
  (Paris)

Resident in Cairo

Resident in London

Resident in other cities 
 
  (Brazzaville)  
  (Madrid)
  (Addis Ababa)
  (Abu Dhabi)
  (Madrid)
  (Bern)
  (Kuwait City)
  (Tripoli)
  (Brussels)
  (Geneva)
  (Valletta)
  (New York City)
  (New York City)
  (Lisbon)
  (Tripoli)
  (Dakar)
  (Madrid)
  (Rabat)
  (Ankara)
  (Abuja)
  (Lisbon)

Closed missions

See also 
 Foreign relations of Algeria
 List of diplomatic missions of Algeria
 Visa policy of Algeria
 Visa requirements for Algerian citizens

Notes

References

External links
 Algerian Ministry of Foreign Affairs (in Arabic, English and French)

 
Diplomatic
Algeria